Mandana is a given name of the following people
Mandana Dayani, American branding, technology, and fashion expert 
Mandana Jones, British actress 
Mandana Karimi, Iranian actress and model 
Abigail Mandana Holmes Christensen (1852–1938), American collector of folklore
Maṇḍana Miśra, 8th century Hindu philosopher
Mandana Moghaddam, Iranian-Swedish visual artist 
Mandana Seyfeddinipur, Iranian linguist
Mandana Coleman Thorp (1843-1916), American Civil War nurse, singer, patriot; public official